XHQC-FM is a radio station on 93.5 FM in Saltillo, Coahuila. The station is owned by Multimedios Radio and carries a pop format under the Stereo Saltillo name. It is similar to the Hits FM stations operated by the same group.

History
XHQC received its first concession on July 15, 1985, making it Saltillo's second station on FM and first new FM station since 1968. The concession was held by Jorge Campo Rodríguez until 2000, but in actuality, it was the first station in Saltillo to be operated by Multimedios Radio.

References

Radio stations in Coahuila
Radio stations established in 1985
Mass media in Saltillo
Multimedios Radio
1985 establishments in Mexico